And We Danced may refer to:

"And We Danced" (Macklemore song)
"And We Danced" (The Hooters song)